A private, non-affiliated institution, the University of the North, also nicknamed Uninorte, is the main academic center for higher education in northern Colombia. It is located in Barranquilla, Atlántico, the largest city and second largest port in the country's Caribbean region. It was founded in 1966 by a business group led by American entrepreneur Karl C. Parrish. It started academic operation on July 11, 1966, with 58 students and 10 teachers in core courses of business administration and engineering.

According to a recent ranking by Colombian consulting firm BOT SAS, Universidad del Norte is listed among the five best universities in the country.

The university has ten academic divisions, including Engineering, Administrative Sciences, Humanities and Social Sciences, Health Sciences, Legal Sciences, and Basic Sciences. It offers degrees in industrial, mechanical, systems, civil, electrical and electronic engineering. Other degrees include medicine, business administration, law, psychology, international relations, international business, Math, Industrial design, graphic design and architecture. In total, Uninorte offers 28 undergraduate programs, 62 professional specialization programs, 50 master's programs, and 15 doctoral programs. The university also offers some specialization programs in the nearby ports of Santa Marta and Cartagena.

All engineering programs are accredited by the ABET, which is one of the most important international accreditation agencies, located in Baltimore, Maryland, United States.

Uninorte is one of the most important cultural and technological centers in the Caribbean region of Colombia.

Gallery

References

External links
 University website (Spanish version)

Educational institutions established in 1966
Universities and colleges in Colombia
1966 establishments in Colombia